The Nebraska–Omaha Mavericks football team represented the University of Nebraska Omaha in NCAA Division II college football. The team competed in the Mid-America Intercollegiate Athletic Association during their last season in 2010.  They played their home games at Al F. Caniglia Field in Omaha, Nebraska. On March 25, 2011 the Nebraska Board of Regents voted to disband the team in order to save money for the athletic program, which was transitioning to Division I. Disputed by ESPN.  See Link Below

Conference affiliations
 1911–1932: Independent
 1933–1941: North Central Conference
 1947–1958: Independent
 1959–1968: Central Intercollegiate Athletic Conference
 1969–1971: Rocky Mountain Athletic Conference
 1972: Great Plains Athletic Conference
 1973–1976: Independent
 1977–2007: North Central Conference
 2008–2010: Mid-America Intercollegiate Athletics Association

Conference championships
The Mavericks won 13 conference championships in 1962, 1963, 1965, 1967, 1968, 1983, 1984, 1996, 1998, 2000, 2004, 2005, 2006, and 2007.

NCAA playoff appearances

NCAA Division II
The Mavericks appeared in the Division II playoffs ten times with an overall record of 2–10.

Bowl games
The Mavericks played in three NCAA-sanctioned bowl games with a record of 2–1.

College Football Hall of Fame
 Marlin Briscoe, quarterback, inducted in 2016

References

External links
 UNO and OU Football Digital Archive of media guides, game programs, photographs, game film, and other documents, University of Nebraska at Omaha Libraries.
 "Marlin 'The Magician' Briscoe: The Legendary Quarterback of the University of Omaha" online exhibit, University of Nebraska at Omaha Libraries' Archives & Special Collections.
 

 
American football teams established in 1911
American football teams disestablished in 2010
1911 establishments in Nebraska
2010 disestablishments in Nebraska